Aubrey Radcliffe was a trustee at Michigan State University.

Life
Radcliffe was the first, and  the only, African-American Republican elected to statewide office in Michigan when the voters placed him on the board of trustees in the 1970s. He fought for divestment from South Africa while serving on the board in the early 1980s. Radcliffe was a resident of East Lansing, an honorary member of Delta Upsilon International Fraternity, and held a Ph.D. in psychology from Michigan State University. He worked as a counselor at J.W. Sexton High School in Lansing.

Death
Aubrey Radcliffe died Friday, March 27, 2009, in East Lansing, Michigan at age 75.

Michigan State University alumni
2009 deaths
1933 births
Michigan Republicans
20th-century American academics